The Tuivai River is a river in India, a tributary of the Barak River, into which it flows at Sipuikawn/Tipaimukh. It forms part of the boundary between India and Myanmar and part of the boundary between the Indian states of Manipur and Mizoram.

References

Rivers of Manipur
Rivers of India